Sir James Balfour, 1st Baronet of Denmilne and Kinnaid ( – 1657), of Perth and Kinross, Scotland, was a Scottish annalist and antiquary.

Biography
James Balfour was a son of Sir Michael Balfour of Denmilne, Fife, and Joanna Durham.

Balfour was well acquainted with Sir William Segar and with William Dugdale, to whose Monasticon he contributed. He was knighted by King Charles I in 1630, was made Lord Lyon King of Arms in the same year, and in 1633 baronet of Kinnaird. He was arbitrarily removed from his office of Lord Lyon by Oliver Cromwell and died in 1657.

Some of his numerous works are preserved in the Advocates' Library at Edinburgh, together with his correspondence, from which rich collection James Haig published Balfour's Annales of Scotland in four volumes (1824–1825). James Maidment also extracted papers from the collection in order to publish them.

His arms were Or, on a chevron sable between three cinquefoils vert an otter's head erased of the field but also given as three trefoils slipped vert.

Arms

References

Attribution
 which in turn cites:
 Sibbald, Robert (1699) Memoria Balfouriana; sive, Historia rerum, pro literis promovendis, gestarum a ... fratribus Balfouriis ... Jacobo ... et ... Andrea. Authore R.S.. Edinburgi: Typis Hæredum Andreæ Anderson

Further reading

External links

1600s births
1650s deaths
Baronets in the Baronetage of Nova Scotia
People from Perth and Kinross
Scottish antiquarians
17th-century Scottish historians
Lord Lyon Kings of Arms
James, Denmilne